Gerisik or Gersik or Grisek may refer to one of these two different places or locations in the area or region of Muar, Johor, Malaysia.
Gersik, the official spelling for Kampung Sungai Gersik a place or village located in Sri Menanti, Sungai Balang, Parit Jawa, Muar, Johor, Malaysia.
Grisek, the official spelling for Mukim Grisek a place or town located in Tangkak District, Johor, Malaysia.''